The 57th edition of the KNVB Cup started in October, 1974. The final was played on May 15, 1975: FC Den Haag beat FC Twente 1–0 and won the cup for the second time in their history, having previously lifted the cup in 1968.

Teams
 All 18 participants of the Eredivisie 1974-75, entering in the second round
 All 19 participants of the Eerste Divisie 1974-75
 9 teams from lower (amateur) leagues

First round
The matches of the first round were played during October 1974.

1 Eerste Divisie; A Amateur teams

Second round
The matches of the second round were played on November 23 and 24, 1974. The Eredivisie clubs entered the tournament this round.

E Eredivisie

Round of 16
The matches of the round of 16 were played on December 29, 1974, and February 8 and 9, 1975.

Quarter finals
The quarter finals were played on March 12, 1975.

Semi-finals
The semi-finals were played on April 16, 1975.

Final
The final was played on May 15, 1975.

FC Den Haag would participate in the Cup Winners' Cup.

See also
 Eredivisie 1974-75
 Eerste Divisie 1974-75

External links
 Netherlands Cup Full Results 1970–1994 by the RSSSF

1974-75
1974–75 domestic association football cups
KNVB Cup